Freestyle skiing at the 2007 Asian Winter Games was held at the Beida Lake Skiing Resort in Changchun, China from 31 January to 1 February 2007.

China dominated the competition winning both gold medals.

Schedule

Medalists

Medal table

Participating nations
A total of 13 athletes from 4 nations competed in freestyle skiing at the 2007 Asian Winter Games:

References
Men's Results
Women's Results

External links
2007 Winter Asiad sports schedule

 
2007 Asian Winter Games events
Asian Winter Games
2007